Wolfred Nelson (10 July 1791 – 17 June 1863) was the mayor of Montreal, Quebec, from 1854 to 1856.

Biography 

Nelson was born in Montreal. His father, William Nelson, was an immigrant to Colonial America from Newsham, North Yorkshire, England. His mother, Jane Dies, was a teacher and daughter of an important land owner in the New York area.

Along with his younger brother Robert Nelson, he was known as a member of the Patriotes and for his leading role in the Lower Canada Rebellion.

Nelson studied at the school of his father in William Henry. He became a physician in January 1811 and subsequently served in that capacity with the British troops on the War of 1812.

He moved to Saint-Denis-sur-Richelieu where he opened a distillery. He entered politics when elected in William Henry in 1827. He supported the Parti Patriote.

In 1827, he was elected as a member of the Legislative Assembly of Lower Canada, but he gave up active politics in 1830, without disavowing his reformist allegiance. He became a Patriote leader in the region of the Richelieu River valley, and supported the use of arms at the Assemblée des Six-Comtés in 1837.

In a prelude to the Lower Canada Rebellion of 1837, Nelson led 5,000 Patriotes in the two-day Assembly of the Six Counties in Saint-Charles, Lower Canada (present-day Quebec), on 23 and 24 October 1837, to protest the government's Russell Resolutions, taking place despite the 15 June Proclamation forbidding public assemblies. The conference delegates approved the Thirteen Resolutions, based on the republican document Rights of Man written by British and later American Revolutionary Thomas Paine, which was also adopted by proponents of both the American Revolution and the French Revolution. A Column of Liberty was also erected in Saint-Charles' Square.

On 16 November 1837, he and 25 others were charged with high treason. The following month, on 4 December 1837, Louis-Joseph Papineau and Edmund Bailey O'Callaghan joined Nelson at Saint-Denis where they decided to resist arrest, procure arms and ammunition for the people and declare the independence of Lower Canada. It was around this time that Nelson exclaimed, "The time has come, to melt our spoons into bullets."

On 28 February 1838, after having crossed the border from Vermont, Nelson, along with 300 to 400 Patriotes from a secret group called Frères Chasseurs, distributed copies of a declaration of independence written by Nelson's brother, Robert Nelson. Drawn from the American Declaration of Independence, the document listed the crimes that Great Britain had committed against Lower Canada, and defended the right to overthrow the government.

Later, he led a group of armed citizens who resisted arrest by the British army at St-Denis. He was arrested soon after. (See Lower Canada Rebellion.)

Exiled to Bermuda in 1838, Nelson was granted amnesty by the British colonial government and came back to Montreal in 1842. In 1844, he was elected to the new Parliament of the Province of Canada. In 1854, he became mayor of Montreal, and he died in June 1863. He is interred in the Anglican cemetery in Sorel-Tracy and is commemorated by a park in Mercier-Hochelaga-Maisonneuve borough.

Works
 Report of Dr. Wolfred Nelson, one of the inspectors of the provincial penitentiary, on the present state, discipline, management and expenditure of the district and other prisons in Canada East, 1852 (exist also in French)
 , 1853
 Practical views on cholera, and on the sanitaty, preventive and curative measures to be adopted in the event of a visitation of the epidemic, 1854 (exist also in French)
Five years in Panama (1880-1885)

Gallery

See also
Battle of the Windmill
Lower Canada Rebellion

References

Sources
 
 
 
 
  (via Vigile.net)
 

Mayors of Montreal
Members of the Legislative Assembly of Lower Canada
Members of the Legislative Assembly of the Province of Canada from Canada East
Lower Canada Rebellion people
Quebec revolutionaries
1791 births
1863 deaths
Canadian republicans
Quebec sovereigntists
Canadian exiles
Canadian people of American descent
Anglophone Quebec people